The CLASSICS Act or Compensating Legacy Artists for their Songs, Service, and Important Contributions to Society Act is Title II of the Music Modernization Act and was proposed legislation as H.R. 3301 of the 115th United States Congress to amend title 17 of the United States Code, to provide Federal protection to the digital audio transmission of a sound recording fixed before February 15, 1972, and for other purposes.

The bill was first introduced in the House of Representatives on July 19, 2017 by Representative Darrell Issa. A companion bill (S.2393) was introduced in the Senate by Senator Chris Coons on February 7, 2018.

The CLASSICS Act was consolidated into the Music Modernization Act (H.R.5447) on April 10, 2018. The Music Modernization Act passed in the House of Representatives on April 26, 2018, and passed the Senate on September 18, 2018, with the Senate renaming the bill the "Orrin G. Hatch Music Modernization Act" after Senator Orrin Hatch. The Music Modernization Act, with the CLASSICS Act codified as Title II within it, was signed into law by President Donald Trump on October 11, 2018.

Previously, sound recordings made before February 15, 1972 were not covered by federal copyright protection. Some states granted these recordings copyright protection and some did not. The CLASSICS Act was designed to address the patchwork of laws in different jurisdictions. The law grants copyright protection of the recordings until February 15, 2067, effectively giving up to 144 years of protection to early recordings.

The Music Modernization Act was revised to allow older songs to enter the public domain. Recordings made before 1923 entered the public domain after a 3-year period on January 1, 2022, with recordings from 1923 to 1956 entering within the next few decades. Recordings from 1957 to 1972 will be protected until 2067.

References

Proposed legislation of the 115th United States Congress
United States federal copyright legislation
Internet law in the United States